Battlefield Online was a free online first person shooter developed by Neowiz Games, Electronic Arts and DICE, and distributed by Neowiz Games. It was a remake of Battlefield 2. However, its game engine was Battlefield 2142s modified Refractor Engine 2, with graphic-improvements over Battlefield 2. It was developed by Neowiz Games of South Korea with oversight from license-holder Electronic Arts. Having started its second beta test, Battlefield Online unlike Battlefield 2 had shown support for 100-maximal-player battles. The open beta testing of the game was started on March 30, 2010. The game servers were shut down on May 21, 2013.

References

2010 video games
2013 disestablishments in South Korea
First-person shooters
Free-to-play video games
 08
Multiplayer online games
Multiplayer video games
Video game remakes
Video games developed in South Korea
Windows games
Windows-only games
South Korea-exclusive video games